Ann-Kristin Engstad (born 5 April 1982) is a Norwegian politician for the Labour Party.

She served as a deputy representative to the Norwegian Parliament from Finnmark during the term 2005–2009.

On the local level, she has been a member of Hammerfest municipal council and Finnmark county council.

References

1982 births
Living people
Deputy members of the Storting
Labour Party (Norway) politicians
Finnmark politicians
People from Hammerfest
21st-century Norwegian politicians